William Cahill may refer to:

William T. Cahill (1912–1996), American politician
William Vincent Cahill (1878–1924), American painter
William Geoffrey Cahill, soldier, officer and police commissioner in Queensland, Australia

See also
Bill Cahill (disambiguation)